Sigma Omicron Epsilon, Inc., also known as SOE, is a  Native American sorority founded in 1997 at East Carolina University in Greenville, North Carolina. It is one of eight fraternities and sororities across the United States that is considered historically Native American.

History 
Sigma Omicron Epsilon was founded on March 30, 1997, on the campus of East Carolina University by seven Native American women. Its founders envisioned a sisterhood that promoted Native American culture and education, as well as a network for its members. Any women with an interest in Native American culture are eligible for membership.

The sorority's founders were Deidre Arlene Jacobs-Blanks, Jolena Bullard, Berna Linette Chavis, Cabrina Lynne Cummings, Candance Holona Hammonds, Patrice Henderson, and Una Gail Locklear.

Symbols 
Sigma Omicron Epsilon's colors are blue, white, and yellow. Its flower is the yellow rose and its symbol is the butterfly.

Activities 
The sorority's national philanthropy is breast cancer awareness and education. Its members participate in the Susan G. Komen Race for the Cure and a variety of fundraisers. It also offers a scholarship to a female student attending its chapter institutions. In 2019, the East Carolina chapter co-sponsored the My Culture is Not a Costume campaign. The chapters also bring Native American speakers to campus.

Chapters

See also 
 Cultural interest fraternities and sororities
 List of social fraternities and sororities

References 

Native American organizations
Fraternities and sororities in the United States
Native American women's organizations
Native American history of North Carolina
East Carolina University
1997 establishments in North Carolina